Family Gathering is a 1988 American short documentary film by Lise Yasui, exploring three generations of her Japanese-American family, from their immigration to Oregon in the early 20th century through their imprisonment in internment camps during World War II. It was nominated for an Academy Award for Best Documentary Short.

Cast
 Keith Hamilton Cobb as Felix (flashback sequence) (uncredited)

References

External links

Family Gathering at the Center for Asian American Media

1988 films
1988 documentary films
1988 short films
American Experience
American short documentary films
American independent films
Autobiographical documentary films
Documentary films about immigration to the United States
Documentary films about the internment of Japanese Americans
Documentary films about families
1980s short documentary films
1988 independent films
1980s English-language films
1980s American films